Shaun Toub (born February 15, 1958)  is an Iranian-born American actor. He has played the character Yinsen in Iron Man (2008) and Iron Man 3 (2013); Farhad in Crash (2004); Rahim Khan in The Kite Runner (2007); Majid Javadi in the Showtime television series Homeland; and Faraz Kamali in the Apple TV+ Israeli series Tehran (2020).

Early life
Toub was born to an Iranian Jewish family, in Tehran,Imperial State of Iran. His parents were both podiatrists. At age 2, he moved to Manchester, England, where his mother attended podiatry school. He returned to Iran, where he lived until he was 13, before moving to Switzerland. He moved to Nashua, New Hampshire to finish his last year of high school. He decided at age 5 he wanted to become an actor.

He has been a recipient of the Cinema Sepharad award at the 2022 Los Angeles Sephardic Film Festival.

Career

His filmography includes his performance in Michael Bay's Bad Boys with Will Smith and Martin Lawrence, John Woo's Broken Arrow with John Travolta and Christian Slater and Mick Jackson's Live from Baghdad starring Michael Keaton and Helena Bonham Carter for HBO. His performance as Farhad in Paul Haggis's Oscar-winning film Crash received positive reviews. He played the part of the Virgin Mary's father in The Nativity Story. He also played Rahim Khan in The Kite Runner (2007).

In the series Grimm he played the part of Bonaparte, one of the villains of the latest series.

Filmography

Films

Television

Video game

References

External links

Shaun Toub's website {web archive}
Shaun Toub cover story in OCPC magazine {web archive}

Living people
20th-century American male actors
21st-century American male actors
American male film actors
American male television actors
American people of Iranian-Jewish descent
Iranian emigrants to the United Kingdom
Iranian emigrants to the United States
Iranian Jews
Jewish American male actors
Male actors from Manchester
Male actors from Tehran
University of Southern California alumni
21st-century American Jews
American Sephardic Jews
American Mizrahi Jews
Year of birth missing (living people)